The Overcoat is a story by Nikolai Gogol. It may also refer to the title of several films, some based on that story:

 The Overcoat (1916 film), an American film directed by Rae Berger
 The Overcoat (1926 film), a Soviet silent film directed by Grigori Kozintsev and Leonid Trauberg
 The Overcoat (1952 film), originally Il Cappotto, an Italian film directed by Alberto Lattuada
 The Overcoat (1959 film), a Soviet film directed by Aleksey Batalov
 The Overcoat (1997 film), a Greek film
 The Overcoat (2001 film), a Canadian television film produced by the CBC
 The Overcoat (animated film), an upcoming Russian animated feature film